Bourjos is a surname.  Notable people with the surname include:

Chris Bourjos (born 1954), American baseball player and scout, father of Peter
Peter Bourjos (born 1987), American baseball player